Bienvenidos a bordo (English: Welcome Aboard) is an Argentine TV Show created by Endemol. It was hosted by Guido Kaczka from 2020 to January 2022, and from January 2020 Laurita Fernández is the current host. The show is currently aired on eltrece.

Currently Laurita Fernández is the host of the show in which participants of different ages show their qualities and participate for different prizes. The TV program is broadcast at a time suitable for all audiences.

Winners 

 Similar to Fernando Burlando (2022)
 Similar to Hernán Drago (2022)

Nomination and Awards

References 

Argentine television shows
2020 Argentine television series debuts
2022 Argentine television series endings
Television series by Endemol